How Old Are You? is the second solo album released by British singer Robin Gibb in 1983, thirteen years after his debut Robin's Reign in 1970. The album was not a great success in America and failed to chart in Britain but it did spawn an international hit in "Juliet" which topped the charts in Germany. The album reached No. 6 in Germany. The album was produced by Robin and Maurice Gibb with Dennis Bryon.

Overview and recording
In 1982, Gibb with his brothers, Barry and Maurice wrote "Oceans and Rivers". In March, he recorded "My World (In the Palm of Your Hands)" and "Human Being". In October, the Bee Gees recorded "Life Goes On" for the film Staying Alive. "Human Being" was leaked on YouTube on 5 April 2012.

In October 1982, Robin started to record songs for How Old Are You? with Maurice on bass, synthesizer, piano and guitar. Bee Gees drummer Dennis Bryon participated on this album, playing drums and producing the album. Bryon was credited as the backup vocalist. The horns were arranged by Peter Graves. Engineered by Samii Taylor and Dale Peterson. Other musicians included Bee Gees guitarist Alan Kendall on guitar, George Bitzer on piano and synthesizer.

The Boneroo Horns members consisted of Peter Graves, Brett Murphey, Melton Mustafa, Russ Freeland, Neal Bonsanti, Dan Bonsanti and Whit Sidener. The recordings of this album got to the US copyright office on 16 December 1982. The instrumental tracks made heavy use of electronics. Maurice, as a producer, liked a clear sound with good separation. Dennis Bryon's drumming was electronic and was played by drumsticks and programmed in, accompanied by Maurice's bass and synthesizer. Robin sings all of the songs in high range but lower than Barry's falsetto, while the songs on his 1984 album Secret Agent were sung in low range. Related session outtake, "Love is Just a Calling Card" was credited to Robin and Maurice but was not released.

Release
How Old Are You? and the lead single "Juliet" was released in North America on Polydor Records, but the LPs were manufactured in Germany. Polydor did not have a big presence in the United States, and Gibb thought that his album was not released in the US. The other singles "How Old Are You?" and "Another Lonely Night in New York" with "I Believe in Miracles" as the B-side of both two singles were not released as singles in the US. The cover of the album contains a poster photo of film actors Clark Gable and Ava Gardner.

Allmusic critic Joe Viglione described "Danger" as an elegant techno journey and "He Can't Love You" as a frosty march number. Viglione said "Kathy's Gone" has film references, and "I Believe in Miracles" could have been a big hit for both Dolly Parton and Linda Ronstadt.

Track listing
All songs written by Robin and Maurice Gibb.

Personnel
Main artist
 Robin Gibb – lead, harmony and backing vocals

Musicians and production
 Maurice Gibb – piano, synthesizer, rhythm guitar, bass guitar, harmony and backing vocals
 George Bitzer – piano, synthesizer
 Alan Kendall – lead guitar
 Dennis Bryon – drums, percussion, programming, harmony and backing vocals
 Peter Graves, Ken Faulk, Brett Murphey, Melton Mustafa, Russ Freeland, Neal Bonsanti, Dan Bonsanti, Whit Sidener – horns
 Peter Graves, Dick Ashby, Neal Kent, Tom Kennedy, Arthur Sheriff – coordination
 Samii Taylor, Dale Peterson – engineering
 Mike Fuller – mastering
 Jimmy Wormser – photography
 The Cream Group – album design

Charts

Weekly charts

Year-end charts

References

1983 albums
Robin Gibb albums
Polydor Records albums
New wave albums by English artists
Synth-pop albums by English artists
Albums produced by Robin Gibb
Albums produced by Maurice Gibb
Cultural depictions of Clark Gable
Cultural depictions of actors